War on Whistleblowers: Free Press and the National Security State is a 66-minute documentary by Robert Greenwald and Brave New Foundation, released in 2013.

Synopsis
War on Whistleblowers highlights recent cases where American government employees and contractors took to the media to expose fraud and abuse. In all cases the whistleblowing was to the detriment of their professional and personal lives.
With President Obama's commitment to transparency and the passage of the Whistleblower Protection Enhancement Act, there was hope that whistleblowers would finally have more protection and encouragement to speak up. But according to the film, times have never been worse for national security whistleblowers. The Obama administration attacked more whistleblowers under the Espionage Act than all previous administrations combined. According to Whistleblowers, journalists are also harassed for covering these stories.
War on Whistleblowers premiered in April 2013 in theaters and on DVD.

Interviewees

Journalists 
David Carr, Journalist, The New York Times
Lucy Dalglish, Dean of the Philip Merrit College of Journalism, University of Maryland
Glenn Greenwald, Journalist, The Guardian
Seymour Hersh, Journalist
Michael Isikoff, National Investigative Correspondent for NBC News
Bill Keller, Op-Ed Columnist, The New York Times
Eric Lipton, Investigative Reporter, The New York Times
Jane Mayer, Staff Writer, The New Yorker
Dana Priest, Investigative Reporter, The Washington Post
Tom Vanden Brook, Journalist, USA Today
Sharon Weinberger, National Security Reporter

Whistleblowers 
Michael DeKort, Senior Project Manager at Lockheed Martin
Thomas Drake, Former Senior Executive of the National Security Agency 
Franz Gayl, Deputy Branch Head for the Space and Information Operations Integration Branch
Thomas Tamm, Criminal Defense Litigation Attorney

Experts 
Steven Aftergood, Director of the Project on Government Secrecy at the Federation on American Scientists
Danielle Brian, Executive Director at the Project on Government Oversight
Tom Devine, Legal Director of the Government Accountability Project
Ben Freeman, National Security Investigator at the Project on Government Oversight
William Hartung, Director of the Arms and Security Project at the Center for International Policy
J. William Leonard, Former Director of the Information Security Oversight Office
Jesselyn Radack, Director of National Security and Human Rights at the Government Accountability Project
Pete Sepp, Executive Vice President for the National Taxpayers Union
Pierre Sprey, Defense Analyst and Weapons Designer
Winslow T. Wheeler, Director of the Straus Military Reform Project of the Project on Government Oversight

Critical reception 
War on Whistleblowers was reviewed in both the general and the progressive media.

The general media generally gave positive reviews. Rotten Tomatoes gave it a "fresh" rating. The Village Voice called it "Fast-moving and sleekly crafted...accessible without sacrificing nuance or intelligence." Booklist commented on the importance of the message  while Bloomberg noted the subject's timeliness.

References

Further reading 
Brown, David (15 April 2013). "INTERVIEW: War on Whistleblowers' director Robert Greenwald". The Week.
Calderone, Michael, and Sledge, Matt (16 April 2013). "Obama Whistleblower Prosecutions Lead To Chilling Effect On Press". The Huffington Post.
Devine, Ted (16 April 2013). "Obama's dangerously contradictory stance on whistleblowing". The Guardian.
Gosztola, Kevin (16 April 2013). "Robert Greenwald's 'War on Whistleblowers' Shows Importance of Preserving Press Freedom". Firedoglake.
Liebelson, Dana (10 April 2013). "New Film Explores Obama's War on Whistleblowers and the Free Press". Mother Jones.
Vanden Heuvel, Katrina (16 April 2013). "Don't confuse truth-tellers with traitors". The Washington Post.
Wheeler, marcy (15 April 3013). "War on Whistleblowers: How the Obama Administration Destroyed Thomas Drake For Exposing Government Waste". Alternet.

2013 films
Films directed by Robert Greenwald
2010s English-language films